Spinulata maruga is a moth in the family Cossidae. It is found in Brazil (Parana).

References

External Links 
Natural History Museum Lepidoptera generic names catalog

Cossulinae
Moths described in 1901